James Booth Jr. (November 21, 1789 – March 29, 1855) was the chief justice of what later became the Delaware Supreme Court from 1841 until his death in 1855.

Early and family life

Born in New Castle, Delaware, the son of Delaware Supreme Court Chief Justice James Booth Sr., the younger James Booth had a younger brother William Booth (1799-1870) and sisters Maria Booth Rogers (1786–1870) and Elizabeth Booth (1796–1883). He graduated from Princeton University.
He married Hannah Rogers (1797–1857), the daughter of Governor Daniel Rogers and they had a son James Rogers Booth (1828–1896) and daughters Anna Rogers Booth Lockwood (1820–1894) and Julia M Booth Burton (1833–1921).

Career
After reading law, Booth was admitted to the Delaware bar in 1812. Nearly three decades later, in 1841, Governor William B. Cooper appointed him Chief Justice of Delaware's Court of Appeals to succeed Richard H. Bayard, who had become one of the state's two U.S. Senators.

This Booth may be best known for granting a writ of habeas corpus in 1846, which freed the enslaved wife and children of freedman Samuel Hawkins, who were thus allowed to ride to Pennsylvania and freedom. However, the two owners of Hawkins' wife and children would seek the prosecution of Quakers John Hunn and Thomas Garrett for violating the federal Fugitive Slave Act, and the heavy fines assessed by U.S. Supreme Court Chief Justice Roger Taney had severe consequences for the Garrett and Hunn families.

Death and legacy

James Booth Jr. died in 1855 and is buried with his father and mother and other family members at historic Immanuel Episcopal Church on the Green in New Castle, Delaware. His widow, siblings, son and daughters would survive the American Civil War.

References

1789 births
1855 deaths
Delaware lawyers
Chief Justices of Delaware
Secretaries of State of Delaware
19th-century American judges
19th-century American lawyers